Acrocercops scriptulata is a moth of the family Gracillariidae. It is known from India (Karnataka) and Taiwan.

The larvae feed on Terminalia paniculata. They probably mine the leaves of their host plant.

References

scriptulata
Moths of Asia
Moths described in 1916